Bagdadia tugaella is a moth in the family Gelechiidae. It was described by Ponomarenko in 1995. It is found in Tajikistan.

References

Moths described in 1995
Bagdadia